Sigfús Sigurðsson may refer to:

Sigfús Sigurðsson (athlete) (1922–1999), Olympic shot putter from Iceland
Sigfús Sigurðsson (handballer) (born 1975), Olympic handball player from Iceland